Kalker Friedhof  is an urban cemetery in Cologne, Germany in the district of Merheim. The cemetery was established in 1904.

In the 1960s, the cemetery was expanded to its current size of about 15.4 hectares.

References

External links
 
 

Cemeteries in Cologne